Thopeutis is a grass moth genus (family Crambidae) of subfamily Crambinae, tribe Haimbachiini. Some authors have placed it in the snout moth family (Pyralidae), where all grass moths were once also included, but this seems to be in error.

Species

References

Haimbachiini
Crambidae genera
Taxa named by Jacob Hübner